The Serbian Hockey League Season for 1998-1999 was the eighth season of the league. Only three teams participated. The teams from Belgrade were out because the arena in Belgrade was out. HK Vojvodina was the winner, in what started a long dynasty of winning the league titles. This was also the first season that HK Novi Sad participated.

Teams
HK Vojvodina
HK Spartak Subotica
HK Novi Sad

Regular season standings

Playoffs
There were only the finals. HK Vojvodina beat HK Novi Sad in a best of two series.
Game 1 - HK Vojvodina vs HK Novi Sad 3-4
Game 2 - HK Vojvodina vs HK Novi Sad 7-2

Serbian Hockey League
Serbian Hockey League seasons
Serb